Igor Mijović (born 11 July 1985) is a Serbian footballer who plays with FK Hajduk Beograd.

Born in Belgrade, he was Red Star Belgrade player for a decade but never debuted for team in the league but instead playing on loan at several Serbian clubs. Among those clubs, he played with FK Hajduk Beograd in the 2004–05 First League of Serbia and Montenegro and later has made one appearance while on loan at FK Mladi Radnik in their only season in the Serbian SuperLiga in 2009–10.

Notes

Living people
1985 births
Serbian footballers
Footballers from Belgrade
Red Star Belgrade footballers
FK Mladi Radnik players
FK Hajduk Beograd players
FK Srem players
Serbian SuperLiga players

Association football forwards